Iolaus argentarius is a butterfly in the family Lycaenidae. It is found on Madagascar. The habitat consists of forests.

References

External links

Images representing Iolaus argentarius at Barcodes of Life

Butterflies described in 1879
Iolaus (butterfly)
Endemic fauna of Madagascar
Butterflies of Africa
Taxa named by Arthur Gardiner Butler